Mehdi Zoubairi is a Moroccan footballer. He plays as a defender for Kawkab Marrakech.

Zoubairi was selected for the Morocco national under-23 football team which participated in qualifying for the 2008 Summer Olympics.

References

1988 births
Living people
Moroccan footballers
Sportspeople from Marrakesh
Kawkab Marrakech players
Association football defenders